Tabloid may refer to:

 Tabloid journalism, a type of journalism
 Tabloid (newspaper format),  a newspaper with compact page size
 Chinese tabloid
 Tabloid (paper size), a North American paper size
 Sopwith Tabloid, a biplane aircraft
 Tabloid (film), a 2010 documentary by Errol Morris 
 Tabloid (TV series), a Canadian television series

See also
 The Tabloid (Matlock episode), 1994 episode of the television show Matlock
 Tabloid Magazine (disambiguation)